IOOF Hall, also known as Lockwood Lodge No. 653, is a historic Independent Order of Odd Fellows building located at Hunter in Greene County, New York.  It was built in 1917 and is a -story,  three-by-six-bay, wood-frame gable-roofed structure. It was used as a fraternal hall until the late 20th century.

It was listed on the National Register of Historic Places in 2002.

References

Clubhouses on the National Register of Historic Places in New York (state)
Odd Fellows buildings in New York (state)
Queen Anne architecture in New York (state)
Buildings and structures completed in 1913
Buildings and structures in Greene County, New York
1913 establishments in New York (state)
National Register of Historic Places in Greene County, New York